As of October 2018, only the Delta IV remains in production. Single-stick versions of Delta IV was retired by United Launch Alliance (ULA) in 2019 and replaced by the ULA Atlas V, leaving the Delta IV Heavy the only remaining operational member of the Delta family, flying US national security missions.

Notable missions

Gravity Recovery and Interior Laboratory (GRAIL)

Orbiting Carbon Observatory 2 (OCO-2)

Exploration Flight Test-1 (EFT-1)

Soil Moisture Active Passive (SMAP)

Launch statistics

Rocket configurations

Launch sites

Launch outcomes

Launch history 

Future launches are listed in the 2020-2029 decade.

See also 
 List of Atlas launches (2010–2019)

References 

{| class="wikitable plainrowheaders" style="width: 100%;"

|- 
| colspan=10 style="background:white;" |

Lists of Thor and Delta launches
Lists of Delta launches